Mettin Copier (born January 4, 1989) is a Dutch-born Austrian footballer who plays for SG Quelle Fürth in the German Landesliga Bayern-Nordost.

Club career
Copier played for youth teams SV Siveo'60 and USV Elinkwijk, before joining the academy of Dutch Eredivisie side AZ Alkmaar in 2007. He played extensively for Alkmaar's reserves, and was promoted to the senior team in 2009. After a short period on loan at Telstar in the Eerste Divisie in 2010, during which he played four games but found himself marginalized following a change of manager, Copier moved to FC Oss in 2010, playing 3 games and scoring 2 games for the team.

Copier moved to the United States in 2011 to play for the Dayton Dutch Lions in the USL Professional Division in 2011.

In summer 2014 he joined FC Breukelen from fellow amateurs RKSV Leonidas, in Rotterdam.

In November 2017, Copier moved to seventh-tier Bezirksliga Mittelfranken 1 club ASV Fürth. Ahead of the 2019–20 season, he moved to the sixth-tier Landesliga Bayern-Nordost club SG Quelle Fürth.

International
Copier, whose father is Dutch and whose mother is Austrian, announced his intention to play for the Austria national football team in 2007. He received his first cap for the Austria national under-21 football team on March 25, 2009 in a game against Italy, and six days later played his second game in a 2-1 loss to Switzerland.

References

External links
 Dayton Dutch Lions profile
 C opier's RKSV Leonidas Debut, in 3-5 Win

1989 births
Living people
Footballers from Amsterdam
Association football defenders
Austrian footballers
Austrian expatriate footballers
Austria under-21 international footballers
Dutch footballers
USV Elinkwijk players
AZ Alkmaar players
SC Telstar players
TOP Oss players
Dayton Dutch Lions players
Eerste Divisie players
Derde Divisie players
Expatriate soccer players in the United States
Austrian expatriate sportspeople in the United States
RKSV Leonidas players
USL Championship players
SG Quelle Fürth players
Landesliga players
Expatriate footballers in Germany
Austrian expatriate sportspeople in Germany